'Open to Export' is a free online information service from The Institute of Export & International Trade, dedicated to helping small UK businesses get ready to export and expand internationally. It provides webinars and articles covering five different stages of international trade: 'Getting started', 'Selecting a market', 'Reaching customers', 'Pricing and getting paid' and 'Delivery and documentation'.

Export Action Plan 
The 'Export Action Plan' is an online planning tool on Open to Export that allows businesses to take ownership of their international strategy. It asks companies to answer questions and set actions along the five simple steps to export success, from getting started to delivery and documentation. Once completed, the company can download a PDF report of their export strategy, which they can take to their bank, adviser, or submit to Open to Export's quarterly competitions.

Export Action Plan Competitions 
Open to Export runs quarterly competitions encouraging businesses to complete their 'Export Action Plans'. 10 finalists are invited to a showcase final, with one winner being selected by a panel of expert judges to win a cash prize and further support prizes towards the implementation of their plans.

Open to Export has run eight UK-only competitions and one global competition - the 'Open to Export International Business Awards'. The Open to Export International Business Awards were run with the support of the World Trade Organisation and the International Chamber of Commerce. The Institute of Export & International Trade were named a 'Small Business Champion' by the WTO and ICC upon the completion of the competition.

The 10th Export Action Plan competition was opened in November 2019 and companies have until 25 January to enter.

Previous winners 
Charles Farris

Klick2Learn

Lick Frozen Yogurt

First Chop Brewing Arm

Genevieve Sweeney

four three six

The Great British Baby Company

Bubblebum (UK) Ltd

Dytech Limited (Zambia) - international winner

History 

The site launched in beta in May 2012, during this time Open to Export limited the business sectors to technology, and the overseas markets to the US and India.

The site officially launched in October 2012. At the time of launch Lord Green, then Minister of State for Trade and Investment, said: "Supporting more small and medium-sized enterprises to export is a key part of the government's plan for growth," and went on to say "Half of the UK's exports, by value, already come from SMEs. Open to Export will provide practical assistance, advice and support to other businesses looking to make that crucial first step to sell into foreign markets."

Ownership of Open to Export was taken on by the Institute of Export & International Trade in April 2017.

See also 
 Export
 Trade
 International trade
 List of countries by exports

References

External links 
 Open to Export

Business organisations based in the United Kingdom